Karahalios is a surname. Notable people with the surname include:

Belinda Karahalios (born 1982), Canadian politician
Karrie Karahalios, American computer scientist
Zisis Karahalios (born 1996), Greek footballer

Greek-language surnames